Saint-Pardoux-et-Vielvic (Languedocien: Sent Perdon e Vièlhvic or Sent Pardol e Vièlh Vic) is a commune in the Dordogne department in Nouvelle-Aquitaine in southwestern France.

Population

See also
Communes of the Dordogne department

References

Communes of Dordogne